Bill Van Dyke (December 15, 1863 – May 5, 1933) was an outfielder in Major League Baseball in the 19th century. He played for the Toledo Maumees of the American Association in 1890, the St. Louis Browns of the National League in 1892, and the Boston Beaneaters of the National League in 1893. While playing for Toledo, Van Dyke hit for the cycle on July 5, 1890.

See also
 List of Major League Baseball players to hit for the cycle

References

External links
, or Retrosheet

1863 births
1933 deaths
19th-century baseball players
Baseball players from Illinois
Major League Baseball left fielders
Toledo Maumees players
St. Louis Browns players
Boston Beaneaters players
Omaha Omahogs players
Keokuk Hawkeyes players
Leadville Blues players
Lincoln Tree Planters players
Des Moines Hawkeyes players
Des Moines Prohibitionists players
Toledo Black Pirates players
Sioux City Corn Huskers players
Rock Island-Moline Twins players
Marinette Badgers players
Buffalo Bisons (minor league) players
Albany Senators players
Erie Blackbirds players
Los Angeles Angels (minor league) players
Jacksonville Jacks players
St. Paul Apostles players
Montgomery Senators players
Atlanta Crackers players
People from Paris, Illinois